Khaidi Babai is a 1974 Indian Telugu-language film directed by T. Krishna. A remake of the 1971 Hindi film Dushmun, it stars Sobhan Babu, Vanisri and Sowcar Janaki. The film was released on 15 February 1974.

Plot 

A truck driver, after accidentally running over and killing a hapless man, is forced to provide for the victim's family as an alternative for going to prison.

Cast 
 Sobhan Babu as the truck driver
 Vanisri as the bioscope girl
 Sowcar Janaki as the victim's wife
 Padmanabham as the police constable
 Gummadi as the victim's father
 Jaggayya as the judge

Production 
Khaidi Babai is a remake of the 1971 Hindi film Dushmun. The film was directed by T. Krishna, produced by T. Babul Nath and J. Lakshman Rao under Sri Balaji Chitra. The screenplay was written by P. Satyanand, and dialogues by Bollimuntha Sivaramakrishna. Cinematography was handled by T. M. Sundara Babu, and editing by Adurthi Haranath.

Soundtrack 
The soundtrack was composed by K. V. Mahadevan.

Release and reception 
Khaidi Babai was released on 15 February 1974, and emerged a commercial success. Sobhan Babu won the Filmfare Award for Best Actor – Telugu.

References 

1970s Telugu-language films
Fictional portrayals of police departments in India
Films directed by T. Krishna
Films scored by K. V. Mahadevan
Telugu remakes of Hindi films